The BIOS Centre for the Study of Bioscience, Biomedicine, Biotechnology and Society is an international centre for research and policy on social aspects of the life sciences and biomedicine located at the London School of Economics (LSE), England. It was founded in 2002 by Professor Nikolas Rose, a prominent British sociologist.

About BIOS

BIOS is a multidisciplinary centre at LSE for research into contemporary developments in the life sciences, biomedicine and biotechnology. It is a joint initiative between the Department of Sociology and the Institute of Social Psychology, with the support of the Departments of Government and Law and the Centre for Philosophy of Natural and Social Sciences.

BIOS supports post-doctoral researchers, visiting fellows and professors, and post graduate students. It has an infrastructure which encourages and hosts research supported by funding bodies such as the Economic and Social Research Council (ESRC), the Wellcome Trust, the Medical Research Council and other major funding bodies.

BIOS's ethos is one of empirically grounded and conceptually sophisticated research, conducted in close relation with life scientists, clinicians and policy makers. Among the issues addressed are justice, power and inequality, geopolitics, social and individual identity.

Current major research projects focus on regenerative medicine, social aspects of the neurosciences and psychopharmacology, biosecurity, biopolitics, bioeconomics, translational biology and bioethics. BIOS runs an innovative Masters programme in Biomedicine and Society attracting students from backgrounds in many disciplines in the social and life sciences.

The BIOS community of over 40 researchers includes a large number of doctoral students, postdoctoral fellows, research staff, visiting fellows and professors and associated faculty.

The Director of BIOS is Martin White Professor of Sociology at LSE, Professor Nikolas Rose, who has been recently awarded an ESRC Professorial Research Fellowship for a three-year project entitled 'Brain, Self and Society in the 21st Century'.

References

London School of Economics BIOS

External links
European Neuroscience and Society Network ENSN 
European Science Foundation ESF

Biotechnology in the United Kingdom
Research institutes in London
London School of Economics
Biological research institutes in the United Kingdom
Research institutes established in 2002
2002 establishments in England